The Lyons Lions were a minor league baseball team based in Lyons, Kansas. From 1909 to 1911, Lyons played as members of the Class D level Kansas State League, Central Kansas League in 1912 and Kansas State League in 1913.

History
Minor league baseball in Lyons, Kansas began with the 1909 Lyons "Lions." Lyons became members of the reformed eight–team Class D level Kansas State League. The Arkansas City-Winfield Twins, Great Bend Millers, Hutchinson Salt Packers, McPherson Merry Macks, Newton Railroaders, Strong City-Cottonwood Falls Twins and Wellington Dukes joined Lyons as 1909 league members.

In their first season of play, the Lyons Lions won the 1909 Kansas State League championship. Lyons ended the 1909 season with a record of 61–37, to finish first in the Kansas State League. The Lions finished 0.5 games ahead of the 2nd place Hutchinson Salt Packers as Cecil Bankhead served as manager in leading the team to the championship. Pitcher Robert Hassler of Lyons led the league with 25 wins and 193 strikeouts. No playoffs were held for the duration of the league.

On June 21, 1909, Lyons and McPherson played a 21–inning game at McPherson. Lyons defeated the McPherson Merry Macks 2–1 in the contest, which was played in 2:50.

Continuing play in 1910, Lyons finished 3rd in the Kansas State League standings. The Lyons Lions finished the 1910 season with a record of 57–53 as Cecil Bankhead, Joe Riggert, Hi Ebright and John Jones served as managers. Player/manager Joe Riggert led the Kansas State League with a .362 batting average and 13 home runs, while teammate Walt Sizemore led the league with 18 wins. The Lions finished 13.5 games behind the 1st place Hutchinson Salt Packers in the final standings.

The 1911 Lyons Lions of the Kansas State League ended the 1911 season with a record of 37–27, playing a shortened season. The league disbanded on July 11, 1911, due to crop failures and drought. When the league ceased play, Lyons was in 3rd place in the standings. Spencer Abbott served as manager, as the Lions finished 4.5 games behind the 1st place Great Bend Millers in the shortened season.

The Lyons Lions switched leagues in 1912. Lyons became members of the six–team Class D level Central Kansas League in 1912. The Lyons Lions ended the 1912 season with a 36–54 record, placing 5th in the standings. Blackie Wilson served as manager, as Lyons finished 18.0 games behind the 1st place Great Bend Millers. The Central Kansas League permanently folded following the 1912 season.

In 1913, the Lyons Lions played their final season. Lyons continued play and joined the six–team Class D level Kansas State League. The Manhattan Giants and Junction City Soldiers folded from the league mid–season. The Lyons Lions of their final Kansas State League season with a record of 50–39, placing 3rd. The Lions finished 3.0 games behind the 1st place Great Bend Millers as William Nelson served as the Lyons' manager. Lyons pitcher J.L. O'Byrne led the league with 17 wins in the shortened season.

Lyons folded after the 1913 season as the Kansas State played as a four–team league in 1914. Lyons, Kansas has not hosted another minor league team.

Today, the "Lyons Lions" nickname is still in use locally by Lyons High School sports teams.

The ballparks
The exact name and location of the Lyons Lions' home ballpark is not directly referenced. In the era, Workman Park was the only public park in Lyons, established in 1882. The park is still in use today as a public park.

Timeline

Year–by–year records

Notable alumni

Coonie Blank (1911)
Lee Dressen (1910–1911)
Ben Harris (1909)
Carl Manda (1909, 1912)
John Misse (1911)
Joe Riggert (1909), (1910, MGR)
Farmer Weaver (1910)
Dutch Wetzel (1912)

See also
Lyons Lions players

References

External references
Baseball Reference

Defunct minor league baseball teams
Defunct baseball teams in Kansas
Baseball teams disestablished in 1909
Baseball teams established in 1913
Kansas State League teams
Central Kansas League teams
Rice County, Kansas